Canjuers is a calcareous plateau and a military camp in Provence located in southeastern France. It’s the largest military camp in Continental Europe.

Geography
Situated in the département of the Var in the Prealps of Castellane, on the south of the Verdon Gorge and to the north of Draguignan.

With a median altitude of 800 m, the Plan of Canjuers is a desertic and arid plateau.

History
Its name comes from Campus Julii: the "Julius Camp". Julius Caesar installed a campment in the area before the conquest of Gaul.

The region surrounding the plateau has been occupied by the Army since 1970. The  is the largest military camp in Europe, covering 350 km2. Many farms and hamlets have been evacuated and abandoned.

Landforms of Var (department)
Plateaus of Metropolitan France